Zhanerke Seitkassym (born 5 December 2002) is a Kazakhstani handball player for Kaysar Club and the Kazakhstani national team.

She represented Kazakhstan at the 2019 World Women's Handball Championship.

References

2002 births
Living people
Kazakhstani female handball players
21st-century Kazakhstani women